William H. Burke was an American college football coach. He served as the head coach football at the College of William & Mary for season, in 1899, compiling a record of 2–3. After leaving William & Mary, Burke coached for two seasons at St. Bonaventure University in Allegany, New York. His teams went 1–0 in 1905 and 2–0 in 1906.

Head coaching record

References

Date of birth unknown
Date of death unknown
St. Bonaventure Brown Indians football coaches
William & Mary Tribe football coaches